The Kingston Trio's discography is large and diverse, covering over 50 years and many record labels. Their early—and primary—output was virtually all recorded on Capitol Records and produced by Voyle Gilmore. After their release from Capitol in 1964, they recorded four albums for Decca.

Principal releases

Selected compilations
Capitol Records also released vinyl albums of The Best of the Kingston Trio, Vols I, II, and III between 1961 and 1966, a "duophonic" reissue of cuts from the first two albums named The Kingston Trio Encores in 1961,  and a number of CD compilations and re-issues in the 1980s and 1990s. There are literally scores of vinyl, tape, and CD compilations and reissues by a multitude of companies in the U.S., Germany, Japan, and elsewhere.

Video releases
 The Kingston Trio and Friends Reunion (WhiteStar Video, 1982)
 An Evening with The Kingston Trio (Rhino Video, 1989)
 The Kingston Trio 45th Anniversary Tribute Concert (EDI, 2002)
 Wherever We May Go (Shout Factory, 2006) 
 The Kingston Trio: Fifty Years Of Having Fun (EDI, 2006)
 Live at the Yuma (Kingston Trio Productions, 2007)
 Young Men in a Hurry [TV Series Pilot] (Paramount, 2007)

Discographies of American artists
Folk music discographies